Park Dae-han (born 19 April 1996) is a South Korean footballer who plays for Jeonnam Dragons.

References

1996 births
Living people
South Korean footballers
K League 1 players
K League 2 players
Jeonnam Dragons players
Association football goalkeepers